Baidwan/Vaidwan is a surname of Indian origin. Baidwan (बैदवान)/ Baidvan (बैदवान) /Vaidwan (वैदवान) /Vedwan (वेदवान) is a Jat Gotra in Uttar Pradesh, Punjab (India) and Pakistan. Baidwan and Vaidwan are same gotra. 

Notable people with the surname include:

Harvir Baidwan (born 1987), Indian-Canadian cricketer
Major Sardar Joginder Singh Baidwan (1904–1940), Indian cricketer

Surnames of Indian origin